Hurryville is an unincorporated community in St. Francois County, in the U.S. state of Missouri.

History
The community has the name of E. A. and L. E. Hurry, the original owners of the town site.

References

Unincorporated communities in St. Francois  County, Missouri
Unincorporated communities in Missouri